Maliheh-ye Yek may refer to:
 Maliheh-ye Yek, Ahvaz
 Maliheh-ye Yek, Hoveyzeh
 Maliheh-ye Yek, alternate name of Maliheh-ye Sharqi, Hoveyzeh County